Oak Grove is an unincorporated community in Washington County, in the U.S. state of Ohio.

The Oak Grove Volunteer Fire Department has served the community since the 1950s.

References

Unincorporated communities in Washington County, Ohio
Unincorporated communities in Ohio